Hugh Skidmore (born 2 November 1990) is an Australian speedway rider, who rode for Sheffield Tigers and Redcar Bears in the Premier League i the UK. He won the New South Wales Championship in 2009, and the Queensland State Championship in 2018.

Career
Born in Coffs Harbour, New South Wales, Skidmore was signed to the Sheffield Tigers in June 2009 to ride in the Premier League. He replaced the injured Ritchie Hawkins and impressed during his first few races to earn a contract until the end of the year.

On 29 October 2009 Skidmore was the first rider to be re-signed by the Sheffield Tigers to ride in the 2010 Premier League Speedway Season.

On 3 November 2010 he was again re-signed by the Sheffield Tigers for his third season to ride in the 2011 Premier League Speedway Season.
Skidmore signed for the Redcar Bears for the 2013 season.

References

1990 births
Living people
Australian speedway riders
Sheffield Tigers riders
Redcar Bears riders
People from Coffs Harbour
Sportsmen from New South Wales